William V. Weber (November 9, 1901 – 1989), was a member of the Michigan House of Representatives.

He was born in Viroqua, Wisconsin. During World War II, he served in the United States Navy. He was a Congregationalist.

Political career
Weber was a member of the House of Representatives from 1967 to 1972. Previously, he was a member of the Michigan Republican State Committee in 1963.

References

People from Viroqua, Wisconsin
Republican Party members of the Michigan House of Representatives
Military personnel from Wisconsin
Military personnel from Michigan
United States Navy sailors
United States Navy personnel of World War II
1901 births
1989 deaths
20th-century American politicians